Class 345 may refer to:

British Rail Class 345
FS Class D.345